Justin Charles Medlock (born October 23, 1983) is an American professional football placekicker who is currently a free agent. He most recently played for the Winnipeg Blue Bombers of the Canadian Football League (CFL). He played college football for the University of California, Los Angeles (UCLA), and earned consensus All-American honors. The Kansas City Chiefs selected him in the fifth round of the 2007 NFL Draft. Medlock has also played for the Hamilton Tiger-Cats, Toronto Argonauts and Edmonton Eskimos of the CFL, as well as the Carolina Panthers of the National Football League (NFL).

Early years
Medlock was born in Fremont, California.  He attended Mission San Jose High School In Fremont, and played for the Mission San Jose Warriors high school football team as both a punter and placekicker.  Medlock was ranked ninth in the country and was all-county and all-league at both positions. He averaged 43.1 yards per punt as a punter and made 11 out of 19 field goals in his junior and senior years.

College career
Medlock attended University of California, Los Angeles, where he played for the UCLA Bruins football team from 2003 to 2006. He set a UCLA career record with six field goals of fifty yards or more, and was a four-year letterman.  Overall, he completed 70 field goals on 80 attempts, and 147 of 148 extra point attempts. As a senior in 2006, he was recognized as a consensus first-team All-American.

Professional career

Kansas City Chiefs
Medlock was drafted in the fifth round of the 2007 NFL draft by the Kansas City Chiefs with the 160th overall pick. Medlock was thought to go into the preseason competing with Lawrence Tynes for the kicking job, but the Chiefs traded Tynes to the New York Giants, thus making Medlock the de facto starter. Medlock was inconsistent in the preseason, making 3 of 6 kicks; the Chiefs released Medlock on September 10, 2007, after he converted a 27-yard field goal and missed on a 30-yard attempt in Week 1 against the Houston Texans, and signed Dave Rayner as a replacement.

St. Louis Rams
On February 11, 2008, Medlock signed with the St. Louis Rams. The Rams allowed Medlock to seek a trade after the signing of Josh Brown. He was later released on August 26, 2008.

Toronto Argonauts

Medlock signed with the Toronto Argonauts on April 16, 2009 and competed with fellow new import kicker Eddie Johnson for the kicking spot vacated by the retirement of Mike Vanderjagt. At the end of training camp, the Argos elected to keep both kickers and coach Bart Andrus elected to start Johnson for game one and placed Medlock on the practice roster. Johnson, however, was injured on the opening kickoff when he separated his shoulder when tackling the return man and Medlock was slated to kick for game two of the 2009 Toronto Argonauts season.

On August 14, 2009, Medlock scored seven field goals, tying Lance Chomyc's Argonauts single-game team record and just short of the league record of eight shared by Dave Ridgway, Mark McLoughlin, and Paul Osbaldiston.

Washington Redskins
On February 12, 2010, the Washington Redskins signed Medlock to a future contract. He was waived on June 14, 2010.

Detroit Lions
On June 15, 2010, the Detroit Lions claimed him off waivers. He was waived on June 29, 2010.

Omaha Nighthawks
Medlock was signed by the Omaha Nighthawks of the United Football League on September 8, 2010.

Toronto Argonauts (II)
With struggles by incumbent placekicker Grant Shaw, the Toronto Argonauts elected to re-sign Medlock through the 2011 CFL season. On October 12, 2010, Medlock was released by the Argonauts after the team traded for kicker Noel Prefontaine.

Edmonton Eskimos
On October 14, 2010, Medlock was signed by the Edmonton Eskimos.

Hamilton Tiger-Cats
On March 21, 2011, Medlock was traded by the Eskimos to the Hamilton Tiger-Cats. He  enjoyed a strong 2011 season with Hamilton, making 49 of 55 field goals while also handling punting and kickoff duties. He became a free agent on February 15, 2012.

Carolina Panthers
Medlock signed a 3-year contract with the Carolina Panthers on March 7, 2012. On November 20, 2012, after missing field goals in 3 straight games, Medlock was waived by the Carolina Panthers.

Oakland Raiders
On August 27, 2013, he was signed by the Oakland Raiders. On August 31, 2013, he was waived by the Raiders.

Hamilton Tiger-Cats (II)
On January 8, 2014, Medlock signed with the  Hamilton Tiger-Cats of the Canadian Football League.

Winnipeg Blue Bombers
Medlock signed with the Winnipeg Blue Bombers on February 9, 2016. Medlock set career highs in made field goals (60), attempts (68) and longest field-goal (58 yards) during the 2016 season. Following the season he was named the West Division nominee for Special Teams Player of the Year. He was named a CFL All-Star for the first time in his career, and was named CFL's Most Outstanding Special Teams Player for the 2016 season. Following the season he was re-signed by the Bombers, preventing him from becoming a free-agent in February 2017. Medlock continued his strong play for the following two seasons, punting the ball 200 times (average of 44.1 yards per kick) while converting 98 of 117 field goal attempts (83.8%). On January 7, 2019, Medlock and the Bombers agreed to another two-year extension. Medlock's reliable foot helped lead the Blue Bombers to the 107th Grey Cup in 2019. There he kicked six field goals, tying a CFL record, as the Blue Bombers won the Grey Cup. He did not play in 2020 due to the cancellation of the 2020 CFL season and he became a free agent on February 9, 2021.

Personal life
Medlock is married to LPGA golfer Hannah Jun Medlock.

References

External links
 Winnipeg Blue Bombers bio 
 UCLA Bruins bio
 "Justin Medlock and being a black kicker" (Washington Post column by Dan Steinberg)

1983 births
Living people
All-American college football players
American players of Canadian football
American football placekickers
Canadian football placekickers
Canadian football punters
Carolina Panthers players
Detroit Lions players
Edmonton Elks players
Hamilton Tiger-Cats players
Kansas City Chiefs players
Omaha Nighthawks players
People from Fremont, California
Players of American football from California
Sportspeople from Alameda County, California
St. Louis Rams players
Toronto Argonauts players
UCLA Bruins football players
Washington Redskins players
Winnipeg Blue Bombers players